Results from the 1999-2000 International Baseball League of Australia.

Ladder

Championship series

Northern Division Play-off Series
Held at Palm Meadows, Gold Coast.

Game 1

Game 2

Southern Division Play-Off Series
Held at Melbourne Ballpark, Altona, Melbourne.

Game 1

Game 2

Game 3

Championship series
Held at Palm Meadow Baseball Field, Gold Coast.

Game 1

Game 2

Game 3

Awards

References

International Baseball League of Australia seasons
Baseball
Lea